Oakhill, also known as the Chauncey M. Brewer House, is a single-family home located at 410 North Eagle Street in Marshall, Michigan. It was listed on the National Register of Historic Places in 1974.

History
Chauncey M. Brewer was born in Oneonta, New York in 1814. He worked in a country store until 1835, when he and boyhood friend Charles T. Gorham moved to Clinton, Michigan. In 1836, the two moved to Marshall and opened a general store. 

The store prospered, and in 1838 they a new brick store in the town constructed of brick. In 1840, Gorham moved on to banking, while Brewer remained in the dry goods business. 

In 1859, Brewer constructed a new home, farming the adjacent acreage. He lived here until his death in 1889. The house continued to be used. as a private residence, but was abandoned after about 1950. In 1968, a new owner began extensive restoration, which continued into the 1970s.

Description
Oakhill is a two-and-one-half story red brick Italianate residence. It has a  squared central mass with a truncated hip roof, and a two story rectangular extension attached to one side. 

The roof overhang is supported by decorative double cornice brackets.  A square cupola with arched windows is located in the center of the roof. The attic story contains half-windows framed between the cornice brackets, while the windows on the first two stories are double-hung sash units with white stone lintels. A wide veranda supported by columns runs around the front and side of the house.

References

		
National Register of Historic Places in Calhoun County, Michigan
Buildings and structures completed in 1859